The Baoquansi Caves (Chinese: 保全寺石窟; Pinyin: Bǎoquánsìshíkū) is a Buddhist site located on the western bank of Pingdingchuan, Taibai Township, Heshui County, Gansu in Northwest China. Built during the Northern Wei Dynasty (386AD–534AD) and excavated on an 8-meter tall cliff, Baoquansi consists of 25 horseshoe-shaped niches and 153 stone statues. Most of the niches have been well preserved, however some parts have been damaged by erosion and looting. The Baoquansi Caves is a valuable site to study the spread of Buddhism since it is located on one of the ancient northern Silk Road paths.

Niches description & list 
The Baoquansi Caves were carved into a cliff wall and are 40 meters long and eight meters high, with the grottoes running east to west. Among the niches, three, four, five, and six are the largest. Some of these niches are square-shaped while others are horseshoe-shaped or domed. The largest of all is niche four. The width, height, and depth are all three meters. The main wall consists of the Buddhas Śākyamuni and Prabhūtaratna sitting side by side with Maitreya. The north and south walls are each composed of two Buddhas. There are also two Bodhisattvas standing at the entrance.

Murals 
During the mid to late Northern Wei Dynasty, murals, utilizing many colors, were used to emphasize different characters. These murals mainly included images of the Asparas, the Bodhisattva, the thousand buddhas, Buddha, and donors. These characters were often portrayed as tall and thin figures with a clear composition outline. Various shades of green were also used heavily during the Northern Wei Dynasty. Complementary and supplementary colors were used to create a total sense of harmony.

Relic destruction, protection, and relocation 
Across Chinese history, there has been looting and destruction of buddha statues, however, this was exacerbated in the late 19th and 20th centuries. During the Cultural Revolution, there was an increased belief in destroying ancient Chinese culture. For instance, the "Destroy the Four Olds" motto led to the mass destruction of antique items. After the Cultural Revolution, the Gansu government listed these caves in the Provincial Cultural Relics Protection Unit and sent caretakers to look after the caves. However, despite this protection, looting still continued to plague the area. As a result, the government decided to move three buddha statues in the best condition to the Longdong Ancient Carved Stone Art Museum (Chinese: 陇东古石刻艺术博物馆), where they are now preserved.

See also 

 Western Thousand Buddha Caves
 Eastern Thousand Buddha Caves
 Mogao Caves
 Yulin Caves
 Bingling Temple
 Five Temple Caves
 Maijishan Grottoes
 Tiantishan Caves
 Chinese Buddhism
 Andingsi Grottoes
 Lianhua Temple-Cave

References 

Chinese Buddhist grottoes
Cultural heritage
Buddha statues
Carving